Bumetopia is a genus of longhorn beetles of the subfamily Lamiinae, containing the following species:

subgenus Bumetopia
 Bumetopia albovittata Breuning, 1950
 Bumetopia aliena (Newman, 1842)
 Bumetopia bakeri (Aurivillius, 1927)
 Bumetopia bilinea (Newman, 1842)
 Bumetopia borneensis Breuning, 1969
 Bumetopia brevicornis Makihara, 1978
 Bumetopia conspersa (Aurivillius, 1924)
 Bumetopia elongata Breuning, 1972
 Bumetopia flavomarmorata Breuning, 1947
 Bumetopia flavovariegata (Aurivillius, 1911)
 Bumetopia fornicata (Newman, 1842)
 Bumetopia fornicatoides Breuning, 1980
 Bumetopia intermedia Breuning, 1947
 Bumetopia japonica (Thomson, 1868)
 Bumetopia ohshimana Breuning, 1939
 Bumetopia oscitans Pascoe, 1858
 Bumetopia panayensis Breuning, 1950
 Bumetopia quadripunctata (Heller, 1923)
 Bumetopia sakishimana Hayashi, 1966
 Bumetopia schultzei Breuning, 1950 
 Bumetopia sexpunctata Breuning & de Jong, 1941
 Bumetopia stolata (Matsushita, 1931)
 Bumetopia uniformis Breuning, 1939
 Bumetopia yagii Hayashi, 1994

subgenus Siela
 Bumetopia trigonocephala Heller, 1923
 Bumetopia vittipennis Breuning, 1970

References

Homonoeini